Schiffner is a German surname. Notable people with the surname include:

 Christina Schiffner (born 1949), East German sprinter
 Ria Schiffner (born 1996), German ice dancer
 Sepp Schiffner (born 1930), Austrian Nordic skier
 Victor Félix Schiffner (1862-1944), Austrian botanist

German-language surnames